The Misfit Brigade is a 1987 American television film loosely based on Sven Hassel's novel Wheels of Terror. The film was released in some markets under that title.

Plot
Germany 1943, a German tank is driving through the burning ruins of an unnamed city. The crew of the tank come across a hysterical woman, crying for her "baby" trapped in a partially demolished building. Ignoring an air raid warden, Porta, Tiny, Stege, Old Man and Sven rescue the woman's "baby" only for it to turn out to be her cat. More wildly improbable situations follow, including Little Legionnaire beating Tiny in a fight, before they are sent to the Russian Front. In their assault guns, Bertha I and Bertha II, they launch an attack on Soviet T-34s. Bertha I, commanded by Wilhelm "Old Man" Beier, successfully knocks out a T-34. Meanwhile, Bertha II manage to knock out another T-34 before being knocked out themselves, by a self-propelled gun (SPG) hidden in a nearby wood. Bertha I is immobilized but still manages to knock out the Soviet SPG. They escape back to German lines on foot, losing only young Pvt. "Freckles" Fredericks.

Back at the German lines the platoon witness enemy propaganda before having a wild escapade at a field brothel, returning to their bunker only to find out they're being ordered on a suicide mission.

Cast
 Bruce Davison as Corporal Joseph Porta
 D. W. Moffett as Captain Erich von Barring
 Keith Szarabajka as Sergeant Wilhelm "Old Man" Beier
 David Patrick Kelly as Corporal Alfred "Little Legionnaire" Kalb
 Jay O. Sanders as Lance Corporal Wolfgang "Tiny" Creutzfeldt
 Branko Vidakovic  as Lance Corporal Hugo Stege
 Slavko Štimac as Sven Hassel
 David Carradine as Colonel von Weisshagen
 Oliver Reed as General von Grathwohl

Production
The film was produced under the working title Wheels of Terror and was shot in Yugoslavia.
In Australia the DVD was released under the title Wheels of Terror.

Reception
The film has been described as "a German Dirty Dozen", due to its story of military prisoners forced on a suicide mission deep behind enemy lines.

References

External links
 The Misfit Brigade at Letterbox DVD
 

1987 television films
1987 films
American television films
Films set in Germany
Eastern Front of World War II films
Films directed by Gordon Hessler
World War II television films
Western Front of World War II films
Yugoslav World War II films
British World War II films
Danish war drama films
American war drama films
British war drama films